Ninaja (Serbian Cyrillic: Нинаја) is a mountain in southwestern Serbia, between cities of Novi Pazar and Sjenica. Its highest peak Homar has an elevation of 1,462 meters above sea level.

References

Mountains of Serbia